Gisela Joao Gomes Remelho (born November 6, 1983) is a Portuguese fado singer.

The album Gisela João was number one in Portugal and was Ípsilon/Público's and Blitz's record of the year.

Early years
Born in Barcelos, João soon developed a great interest and passion for Fado, mainly when she reached 8 years old. By the year of 2000, when she was 16/17 years old, João began to sing in "Adega Lusitana", in Barcelos. Soon after, she enrolled in a University in Porto, to study design. It was during her sixth year in Porto that she further immersed in Fado and the various Fado houses that she sang in. 6 years unfolded and João made her choice to settle in Lisboa, in an effort to further explore and develop herself as an artist and Fado singer.

In 2009, she recorded an album with Atlantihda - a Portuguese band, hailing from Porto, that explores the various aspects of folk and world music, melting them with Fado. After that same album, she was invited to sing 2011's "O Fado E As Canções do Alvim", an album by the historical Portuguese guitar master Fernando Alvim, frequent companion of the virtuoso guitar player Carlos Paredes. The album showcases many of the great voices and artists that represented Fado in the 21st century, paying tribute to one of the most distinguished figures of the History of Fado.

Her first years in Lisboa proved to be demanding, both physically and psychologically, making João question her own decisions, whether it was right to follow her dreams and desire to sing Fado and perform live as her career. She sang in various Fado houses, especially in Fado's quarter and "cradle", Mouraria.

Her "conquest" of Lisboa and the capital's Fado night-life, was slow but steady. First conquering the Fado houses, soon enough followed her shows in CCB, Casa da Música, Lux, Festival Caixa Alfama and many more, garnering a huge following for the young rising star, considered by the reporter António Pires one of the biggest newcomers of Fado in recent years .

Now all that was needed was her debut album. The challenge was met when she enlisted Frederico Pereira and went to studio with him, in 2012.

2013–2015: Debut album and international success 
2013 would be João's breakthrough year, confirming her as one of the most exciting new voices from Portuguese Music. In July 2013, her debut album "Gisela João" was released to critical and commercial acclaim. It only took two weeks for her album to reach the #1 spot of the Portuguese Charts. The success was immense, with some Portuguese critics quickly identifying João's debut as the single most important debut of any Portuguese artists in the 21st century. More accolades and appraisal soon followed, which culminated with her victory on the "Prémio Amália" Awards, receiving the award for Best New Artist.

Her quick climb to the Top of the Portuguese Charts, paired with the fantastic reviews from publications such as Blitz, Expresso, Público, Time Out and the website Cotonete, gave João a whole new exposure to the Portuguese public. Live shows all around the country, from Fado Houses to bigger stages in Festivals and more, paved the way for her  sold-out shows in Casa da Música and in Centro Cultural de Belém. Soon after, she was once again garnering even more awards and nominations: "Best Solo Interpreter" in the Globos de Ouro Award, and the Award "José Afonso 2014", with the jury considering her the "best voice to appear since Amália".

In 2014, she embarked on more live shows, expanding her curriculum to international stages, mesmerizing every audience with her electrifying live shows. Her debut album, had already achieved the Gold record, further contributing to her increasing success and impact.

If there was any doubt of João's success and affirmation as one of Portugal's most important artists, those same doubts were quickly disbanded, as she presented herself live in Coliseu dos Recreios, Lisboa and in Coliseu do Porto, Portugal's most iconic and historical stages, for two sold-out shows. Those shows sparked a renewed interest in her album, which received then the "Platinum" record mark.

Once again embarking on International shows: João was invited to perform in a plethora of new countries, including France, Belgium, England, Switzerland, Spain, Brazil, Germany, England, and many, many more. 2015 also marked her participation in the tribute album to Amália Rodrigues, entitled Amália: As Vozes do Fado, comprised with some of the most important names of Fado, where she interprets the songs "Medo" and "Meu Amor, Meu Amor", in a duet with Camané.

By the end of 2015, João presented her live show "Caixinha de Música" (Musical Box), a special program João devised for the Municipal Theatre São Luiz, where she lent her voice to homage some of the biggest and greatest poets and voices of the 20th century and beyond, interpreting songs from Serge Gainsbourg, Bryan Ferry, Nick Cave, Ella Fitzgerald, Violeta Parra, Leonard Cohen, Amy Winehouse, and more.

Her sophomore album was scheduled to be released in 2016. In October 2016, João was confirmed to play at the 31st edition of Eurosonic Noorderslag in Groningen, NL.

Discography 
 Gisela João (Valentim de Carvalho, 2013)
 Gisela João - Ao Vivo (Valentim de Carvalo/Exclusivo Fnac, 2015)
 Nua (Valentim de Carvalho, 2016)
 Aurora (Universal Music Portugal, 2021)

References 

1983 births
People from Barcelos, Portugal
Portuguese fado singers
21st-century Portuguese women singers
Living people